Three Otters is a historic home near Bedford, Bedford County, Virginia. Built about 1827 by local artisans following the pattern book of Asher Benjamin for a local merchant, the large, two-story, brick dwelling exemplifies the Greek Revival style. It is approximately 50 feet square, with a low pitched hipped roof. The original two-story kitchen and pantry outbuilding is connected to the main house by a covered walkway and a two-story brick-and-frame addition. There are a contributing brick well house, chicken house, and necessary.

It was listed on the National Register of Historic Places in 1971.

References

Houses on the National Register of Historic Places in Virginia
Greek Revival houses in Virginia
Houses completed in 1827
Houses in Bedford County, Virginia
National Register of Historic Places in Bedford County, Virginia
1827 establishments in Virginia